Henry Rose may refer to:
Henry H. Rose (1856–1923), mayor of Los Angeles
Henry Rose (cricketer) (1853–1895), New Zealand cricketer
Henry Rose (priest) (1800–1873), English churchman, theologian and scholar
Henry Rose (MP) (fl. 1406), Member of Parliament for Guildford, England
Henry Rose (Irish politician) (1675–1743), Irish politician and judge

See also
Harry Rose (disambiguation)